Shane Tronc (born 19 January 1982) is an Australian former professional rugby league footballer who played for the Brisbane Broncos and the North Queensland Cowboys in the National Rugby League, and the Wakefield Trinity Wildcats in the Super League.

He previously played for the Redcliffe Dolphins, winning the club's Player of the Year award in 2003 before joining the Cowboys. A relative of Queensland state of Origin forward Scott Tronc, his father James Tronc played for the Redcliffe Dolphins and the Souths Magpies in the BRL Premiership.

Background
Tronc was born in Brisbane, Queensland, Australia.

Playing career
While attending Wavell State High School in 1999, Tronc was selected to play for the Australian Schoolboys team.

Tronc played at prop forward in the 2005 NRL Grand Final, the Cowboys' first, which they lost to the Wests Tigers.

During a game against the Brisbane Broncos in Round 18 of the NRL competition Tronc suffered a knee injury which required reconstructive surgery, which ruled him out for the rest of the 2007 NRL season.

He had signed a two-year deal with side Wakefield Trinity Wildcats, in the Super League and was seven matches into his two-year deal with the Wildcats before asking for a release to return home to Brisbane. Reports at the time linked him with a return to the NRL with the Brisbane Broncos.

Tronc then signed with the Brisbane Broncos until the end of 2010.

In July 2011, Tronc was forced into premature retirement by a debilitating neck injury.

Career highlights
2005 NRL Grand Final - Wests Tigers vs North Queensland Cowboys - Runners-Up

References

External links
Shane Tronc at the Cowboys
Wakefield sign Australian Tronc

1982 births
Living people
Australian people of Polish descent
Australian expatriate sportspeople in England
Australian rugby league players
North Queensland Cowboys players
Brisbane Broncos players
Prime Minister's XIII players
Redcliffe Dolphins players
Rugby league props
Rugby league players from Brisbane
Wakefield Trinity players